Purukottam Ramachandran (born 22 August 1971) is an Indian sprinter. He competed in the men's 4 × 400 metres relay at the 2000 Summer Olympics.

References

1971 births
Living people
Athletes (track and field) at the 2000 Summer Olympics
Indian male sprinters
Olympic athletes of India
Place of birth missing (living people)
Asian Games medalists in athletics (track and field)
Asian Games silver medalists for India
Athletes (track and field) at the 1998 Asian Games
Athletes (track and field) at the 2002 Asian Games
Medalists at the 1998 Asian Games
Medalists at the 2002 Asian Games